Leandro de Deus Santos (born 26 April 1977), known as Leandro or Léo de Deus, is a Brazilian former footballer who played as a midfielder.

Football career
Léo de Deus was born in Belo Horizonte, Minas Gerais.

In 2002, he moved to Borussia Dortmund in Germany, on loan from Clube Atlético Mineiro. He spent the vast majority of his two-season spell with the B-team, scoring the first of his two Bundesliga goals on 15 March 2003 against Hannover 96 after only three minutes on the pitch (2–0 home win); ten of his 12 league appearances were made as a substitute – in a rare start, on 12 November 2002, he played 80 minutes in a 0–1 away loss against AJ Auxerre for the campaign's UEFA Champions League, his first and only game in the competition.

Léo de Deus then spent two seasons in Denmark with SønderjyskE Fodbold, the first still owned by Atlético. He eventually retired from football in 2010 at the age of 33, after spells with Brazilian amateur clubs.

Personal life
Léo de Deus's younger brothers, Dedé and Cacá, were also footballers. They too had spells in German football, and he coincided with the former at Borussia during his stint.

Honours
Borussia Dortmund
DFB-Ligapokal: Runner-up 2003

References

External links

1977 births
Living people
Footballers from Belo Horizonte
Brazilian footballers
Association football midfielders
Campeonato Brasileiro Série A players
Clube Atlético Mineiro players
Uberlândia Esporte Clube players
Bundesliga players
Borussia Dortmund players
Borussia Dortmund II players
Danish Superliga players
SønderjyskE Fodbold players
Brazilian expatriate footballers
Expatriate footballers in Germany
Expatriate men's footballers in Denmark
Brazilian expatriate sportspeople in Germany